Craterus may refer to:

Craterus of Macedon, King of Macedon in 399 BC
Craterus, Macedonian general of Alexander the Great
Craterus (historian), half-brother of Antigonus II Gonatas, compiler of historical documents relative to the history of Attica
Crates (engineer), also known as Craterus